The 2005–06 FIS Ski Jumping World Cup was the 27th World Cup season. It began in Kuusamo, Finland on 26 November 2005 and finished in Planica, Slovenia on 19 March 2006. The individual World Cup was won by Jakub Janda, Czech Republic.

Lower competitive circuits this season included the Continental Cup and Grand Prix.

Calendar

Men

Men's team

Individual World Cup 

The jumper highlighted in yellow was the leader of the World Cup at the time of the competition, and wore the yellow jersey.
The jumper highlighted in azure was the leader of the Nordic Tournament  at the time of the competition, and wore the blue jersey.
The jumper highlighted in pink was the leader of the Four Hills Tournament at the time of the competition. This competition has no leader-jersey.

Kuusamo 
Notes:
Both competitions took place 26 November, due to bad weather 25 November. The first competition had only one round.
Janne Ahonen wore the yellow jersey as the reigning champion.

 K-120 Kuusamo, Finland
November 26, 2005

 K-120 Kuusamo, Finland
November 26, 2005

Trondheim 
Notes:
The events was moved to Lillehammer due to warm weather and lack of snow in Trondheim.

 K-120 Lysgårdsbakkene, Norway
December 3, 2005

 K-120 Lysgårdsbakkene, Norway
December 4, 2005

Harrachov 

 K-125 Harrachov, Czech Republic
December 10, 2005

 K-125 Harrachov, Czech Republic
December 11, 2005

Engelberg 
Notes:
 The first competition was cancelled.
 K-125 Engelberg, Switzerland
December 18, 2005

Four Hills Tournament

Oberstdorf 

 K-120 Oberstdorf, Germany
December 29, 2005

Garmisch-Partenkirchen 

 K-115 Garmisch-Partenkirchen, Germany
January 1, 2006

Innsbruck 

 K-120 Innsbruck, Austria
January 4, 2006

Bischofshofen 

 K-125 Bischofshofen, Austria
January 6, 2006

Sapporo 
Notes:
World Cup leader Jakub Janda did not participate in Sapporo.

 K-120 Sapporo, Japan
January 21, 2006

 K-120 Sapporo, Japan
January 22, 2006

Zakopane 

 K-120 Zakopane, Poland
January 28, 2006

 K-120 Zakopane, Poland
January 29, 2006

Willingen 

 K-130 Willingen, Germany
February 4, 2006

Nordic Tournament

Lahti

 K-116 Lahti, Finland
March 5, 2006

 K-120 Kuopio, Finland
March 7, 2006

Lillehammer

 K-120 Lysgårdsbakkene, Norway
March 10, 2006

Oslo

 K-115 Holmenkollen, Norway
March 12, 2006

Planica

 K-185 Planica, Slovenia
March 18, 2006

 K-185 Planica, Slovenia
March 19, 2006
Notes:
World Cup-leader Jakub Janda did not participate.

Team World Cup

Willingen
 K-130 Willingen, Germany
February 5, 2006

Lahti
 K-116 Lahti, Finland
March 4, 2006

Fis Ski Jumping World Cup, 2005-06
Fis Ski Jumping World Cup, 2005-06
FIS Ski Jumping World Cup